The Nash Glacier is a 32 km (20 mi) long glacier, draining the northern slopes of Dunedin Range in the Admiralty Mountains. The terminus of this glacier merges with that of Wallis Glacier and Dennistoun Glacier before reaching the sea east of Cape Scott.

Mapped by United States Geological Survey from surveys and U.S. Navy air photos, 1960–63. Named by US-ACAN for Lt. Arthur R. Nash, USN, helicopter pilot with Squadron VX-6 during Operation Deep Freeze 1967 and 1968.

See also
 List of glaciers in the Antarctic

Admiralty Mountains
Glaciers of Pennell Coast